Palaemon yamashitai is a species of shrimp of the family Palaemonidae. The shrimp is found in China.

References

Crustaceans described in 1970
Fauna of China
Palaemonidae